Lennerd Daneels (born 10 April 1998) is a Belgian professional footballer who plays as a winger for Eerste Divisie club Roda JC.

Club career

Early career
Daneels played in the youth department of Germinal Beerchot until he was scouted to the academy of PSV in 2010. There, he progressed through the various youth teams. He made his Eerste Divisie debut for Jong PSV on 25 August 2017 in a 2–1 win against Helmond Sport as an 80th minute substitute for Joey Konings. On 30 March 2018, he scored his first goal in a 3–0 away victory against Jong Ajax.

RKC
On 31 May 2019, Daneels left PSV as a free agent and joined RKC Waalwijk on a two-year contract for the upcoming 2019–20 season. He made his debut for the club on 3 August in a 3–1 away loss to VVV-Venlo. He came on in the 85th minute of the game to replace Anas Tahiri.

On 28 October 2020, Daneels scored his first goal for the club in a KNVB Cup game against Cambuur.

Roda JC
On 30 August 2022, Daneels signed a two-year contract with Roda JC Kerkrade. He made his Roda debut on 4 September 2022 in a Limburg derby against MVV, replacing Teun Bijleveld in the 62nd minute of a 1–1 draw.

Career statistics

Honours
Belgium U17
 FIFA U-17 World Cup third place: 2015

References

External links
 
 

1998 births
Living people
People from Lille, Belgium
Footballers from Antwerp Province
Belgian footballers
Association football forwards
Beerschot A.C. players
PSV Eindhoven players
Jong PSV players
RKC Waalwijk players
Roda JC Kerkrade players
Eredivisie players
Eerste Divisie players
Belgium youth international footballers
Belgian expatriate footballers
Expatriate footballers in the Netherlands
Belgian expatriate sportspeople in the Netherlands